RMS Caronia was a Cunard Line transatlantic steam ocean liner. She was launched in 1904 and scrapped in 1932. In World War I she was first an armed merchant cruiser (AMC) and then a troop ship.

 was launched in 1905 as her sister ship, although the two had different machinery. When new, the pair were the largest ships in the Cunard fleet.

Building
John Brown & Company of Clydebank launched Caronia on 13 July 1904 and completed her in February 1905. She was the only ship in the Cunard fleet to be named after an American, being named after Caro Brown, granddaughter of Cunard's New York agent.

Caronia was propelled by quadruple-expansion engines. Carmania had steam turbines, and proved to be the more economical of the two.

Her holds included  refrigerated cargo space.

Service
Caronia left Liverpool on her maiden voyage to New York on 25 February 1905. A successful 1906 cruise from New York to the Mediterranean led to Caronia frequently being used for cruising.

On 14 April 1912 Caronia transmitted the first ice warning at 09:00 to RMS Titanic reporting "bergs, growlers and field ice".

In 1914 Cunard briefly placed Caronia on its Boston service. At the start of the First World War the Admiralty requisitioned her to be an armed merchant cruiser. She was stationed off New York on contraband patrol. She was a troop ship from 1916 until after the Armistice of 11 November 1918. Her last duties were to repatriate Canadian troops in 1919. She returned to the Liverpool – New York run after the war.

In 1920 Caronia was converted to burn oil instead of coal.

After returning to service, she sailed on a number of different routes, including:
 Liverpool – New York / Boston
 London – New York
 Hamburg – New York (1922)
 Liverpool – Quebec (1924)
 New York – Havana

Fate
In 1931 Cunard laid up Caronia, and then sold her for £20,000 to Hughes Bolckow & Co for scrap. In 1932 Hughes Bolckow sold her to Kobe Kaiun KK for £39,000, who renamed her Taiseiyo Maru ("The Great Ocean Ship"). Kobe Kaiun had her towed to Osaka, where demolition work started on 28 March 1933.

References

Bibliography

External links

 
 

1904 ships
World War I Auxiliary cruisers of the Royal Navy
Ocean liners of the United Kingdom
RMS Titanic
Ships built on the River Clyde
Ships of the Cunard Line
Steamships of the United Kingdom
Troop ships of the United Kingdom
World War I cruisers of the United Kingdom
World War I passenger ships of the United Kingdom